LZ 17 Sachsen was the fourth Type H improved Schwaben-class Zeppelin that first flew on 3 May 1913 and  operated as a passenger airship with DELAG (Deutsche Luftschiffahrts-Aktiengesellschaft) until WWI, when it was commandeered for service with the Imperial German Army. After being transferred to the Imperial German Navy, LZ17 was dismantled in 1916.

History 
From its introduction until the beginning of WWI, LZ 17 carried 9837 people in 419 flights, mainly on sightseeing flights in the service of DELAG, primarily between Dresdsen, Leipzig, Potsdam, Hamburg, Friedrichshafen, Baden-Oos, and Leignitz.

Peter Strasser, leader of the Imperial German Navy airship service, received his training on board the airship in 1914 and shortly thereafter it took part in several raids against Antwerp. It quickly became clear that the airship was not suitable for warfare on the western front, and as a result was transferred to Allenstein in early 1915, continuing with smaller raids on Białystok and Ciechanów throughout the year.

As LZ 17A, the airship was transferred to the Imperial German navy at Königsberg, where it was decommissioned 12 months later, in 1916, as one of Germany's most successful small airships.

Specifications (Military Type H Zeppelin)

Notable Captains 
Several captains commanded LZ 17, they included:

 Hugo Eckener
 Ernst A. Lehmann
 Georg Hacker

References

Airships
Zeppelins
Airships of Germany
Rigid airships
Military airships of World War I
Airships of the Imperial German Navy
Aircraft first flown in 1913
Hydrogen airships